Tony Cascio (born March 28, 1990) is an American soccer player.

Career

College and Amateur
Tony begin his soccer career playing for Hamilton High School in his home town of Chandler, Arizona.  Cascio played college soccer at the University of Connecticut between 2008 and 2011. During his time at UConn, Cascio was named 2010 NSCAA First Team All-American, Big East Offensive Player of the Year in 2010, and was a two-time All-Big East First Team selection in both 2009 and 2010. During his junior year, he was named NSCAA/Performance Subaru Division I First Team All-American, Soccer America MVP Second Team, and was a MAC Hermann Trophy Semifinalist. As a sophomore, was named to the Northeast Region Second Team and selected to the All-Big east First team.

Professional

Colorado Rapids
The Colorado Rapids selected Cascio in the first round (No. 14 overall) of the 2012 MLS SuperDraft.

Cascio made his debut during a 2–0 win over Columbus Crew on March 10, 2012. Cascio recorded his first professional goal against the Philadelphia Union on March 18, 2012 by beating defender Chris Albright to fire home past Zac MacMath.

Houston Dynamo
Cascio was loaned to the Houston Dynamo for the 2014 season in exchange for a season's use of an international roster spot. He was the first player to be loaned within MLS.

Orlando City SC
Cascio was selected in the 2nd round of the 2014 Expansion draft by Orlando City SC.

Started and played 57 minutes in preseason game and was on the bench for the first two games of 2015 but missed the next six months due to a bulging disc in his back.

Arizona United SC
Cascio signed with Arizona United on March 8, 2016.

Sporting Arizona FC
Cascio signed with Sporting Arizona FC of the UPSL on March 7, 2018.

References

External links
 

1990 births
Living people
People from Gilbert, Arizona
Sportspeople from the Phoenix metropolitan area
Soccer players from Arizona
American soccer players
Association football midfielders
UConn Huskies men's soccer players
All-American men's college soccer players
Colorado Rapids draft picks
Colorado Rapids players
Houston Dynamo FC players
Orlando City SC players
Phoenix Rising FC players
Major League Soccer players
USL Championship players